Mosses is a town in Lowndes County, Alabama, United States. At the 2010 census the population was 1,029, down from 1,101 in 2000. It is part of the Montgomery Metropolitan Statistical Area. It incorporated in 1979.

Geography
Mosses is located at  (32.173120, -86.677296).

Demographics

At the 2000 census there were 1,101 people, 364 households, and 281 families in the town. The racial makeup of the town was 97.82% Black or African American, 1.18% White, 0.09% Native American, 0.09% Asian, and 0.82% from two or more races. 0.45% of the population were Hispanic or Latino of any race.
Of the 364 households 44.8% had children under the age of 18 living with them, 25.5% were married couples living together, 45.6% had a female householder with no husband present, and 22.8% were non-families. 20.6% of households were one person and 3.6% were one person aged 65 or older. The average household size was 3.02 and the average family size was 3.50.

The age distribution was 34.6% under the age of 18, 12.9% from 18 to 24, 27.2% from 25 to 44, 17.2% from 45 to 64, and 8.2% 65 or older. The median age was 27 years. For every 100 females, there were 84.1 males. For every 100 females age 18 and over, there were 74.8 males.

The median household income was $17,031 and the median family income  was $22,273. Males had a median income of $21,528 versus $16,771 for females. The per capita income for the town was $8,268. About 39.0% of families and 43.0% of the population were below the poverty line, including 54.4% of those under age 18 and 35.9% of those age 65 or over.

2010 census
At the 2010 census there were 1,029 people, 369 households, and 270 families in the town. The racial makeup of the town was 97.9% Black or African American, 1.5% White, 0.0% Native American, 0.0% Asian, and 0.1% from two or more races. 1.8% of the population were Hispanic or Latino of any race.
Of the 369 households 23.8% had children under the age of 18 living with them, 24.1% were married couples living together, 42.5% had a female householder with no husband present, and 26.8% were non-families. 25.5% of households were one person and 6.5% were one person aged 65 or older. The average household size was 2.79 and the average family size was 3.38.

The age distribution was 26.7% under the age of 18, 11.4% from 18 to 24, 25.3% from 25 to 44, 26.4% from 45 to 64, and 10.2% 65 or older. The median age was 34.7 years. For every 100 females, there were 86.8 males. For every 100 females age 18 and over, there were 88.1 males.

The median household income was $13,750 and the median family income  was $16,319. Males had a median income of $19,583 versus $25,833 for females. The per capita income for the town was $8,053. About 53.4% of families and 55.4% of the population were below the poverty line, including 65.1% of those under age 18 and 51.1% of those age 65 or over.

References

Towns in Lowndes County, Alabama
Towns in Alabama
Montgomery metropolitan area